Belém (Portuguese for Bethlehem) is a settlement in the southwest of the island of Santiago, Cape Verde. It is part of the municipality of Ribeira Grande de Santiago. It is 2 km west of Santana, 6 km north of Porto Gouveia and 11 km northwest of the municipal seat Cidade Velha. In 2010 its population was 382.

References

Villages and settlements in Santiago, Cape Verde
Ribeira Grande de Santiago